Jeffrey Allan Leigh (26 October 1950 – 2 July 2012) was a New Zealand cricketer who played five first-class matches for Northern Districts. Leigh was a left-handed tail-end batsman and a wicketkeeper; he batted only three times in his five first-class matches and scored just seven runs, all in one not-out innings. He took 10 catches.

Leigh died on 2 July 2012.

References 

1950 births
2012 deaths
New Zealand cricketers
Northern Districts cricketers
Sportspeople from Stratford, New Zealand
Wicket-keepers